Gisela Peter is a former Swiss curler.

At the national level, she is a two-time Swiss women's champion curler (1987, 1990), a Swiss mixed champion curler (1994) and a Swiss Junior champion curler (1986).

Teams

Women's

Mixed

References

External links
 

Living people
Swiss female curlers
Swiss curling champions
Year of birth missing (living people)